Magoffin County High School (MCHS) is a public secondary-level education high school located in Salyersville, Magoffin County, Kentucky and is part of the Magoffin County Public School District. MCHS is the only high school located within Magoffin County.

History
Tragedy struck the Magoffin County High School building at Hornet Drive on March 2, 2012, when an EF3 tornado caused extensive damage to the primary building, along with multiple other buildings in the area. Two years passed until $40 Million in funding was raised to build a new complex for Magoffin County High School adjacent to the Mountain Parkway and US 460.

In August 2016 the new buildings were open to all students. This included a new Gymnasium, a new Football Field, a new Running Track, all new classrooms and cafeterias.

Starting in 2004, Magoffin County High School teamed up with local cable provider "Howard Cable" to create the "Magoffin County Schools Television" channel (MCS-TV). The channel's programming includes school athletics games, club-created programs, field trip memorial videos and other original programming focused on the county's public schools.

Career and technical development
In addition to the primary Magoffin County High School building, the public school system offers the Magoffin County Career & Technical Center (MCCTC). The career development programs offered by MCCTC include Electricity, Carpentry, Welding, Computing and Horticulture.

Clubs

Magoffin County High School offers many clubs to its students. These include Academic Team, Beta Club, Champions Against Drugs, Students Against Drunk Drivers, Christian Youth Club, Drama Club, Key Club, MCHS Band, MCHS Cheerleaders, MCHS Dance Team, MCHS Yearbook.

Sports
Magoffin County High School offers many extra-curricular sports activities. These include boys' baseball, boys' and girls' basketball, cheerleading, boys' and girls' cross country, dance team, American football, girls' fast pitch softball, golf, boys' and girls' tennis, boys' and girls' track & field and girls' volleyball.

In 2006, Head Coach Steve Miller and his Magoffin County Lady Hornets basketball team won the 15th Regional Basketball Championship. The boys' and girls' track and field teams have produced numerous individual regional championships with respectful placings in state competitions. The Magoffin County High School Dance Team has won many regional and state championships.

References

External links
Magoffin County Schools

Public high schools in Kentucky
Schools in Magoffin County, Kentucky
Salyersville, Kentucky